Fancy Lala, known in Japan as , is a magical girl anime series produced by Studio Pierrot in 1998, following an OVA released in 1988.  A two-volume manga adaptation by Rurika Kasuga ran in Ribon.  The original designs were created by Akemi Takada, who worked on many of the 80s' Studio Pierrot series.  The anime series was licensed for English release by Bandai Entertainment with a dub produced in Calgary and Edmonton, Alberta, Canada by Blue Water Studios. This is the final magical girl anime Pierrot has produced thus far.

Plot summary
One day, a 9-year-old elementary schoolgirl named Miho Shinohara is given two stuffed dinosaurs by a unnamed stranger. The stuffed dinosaurs come to life and they present her with a magic sketchbook and pen.  Within limits, and subject to varying degrees of control, she can draw in the sketchbook and bring the drawings to life.   Miho can also transform into a teenage girl, whom she names Fancy Lala. One day, Lala is scouted by Yumi Haneishi, the president of the talent agency Lyrical Productions, and begins the long road to stardom.

Characters

Main cast
  / 
 
 A 9-year-old elementary school  girl, Miho dreams of one day drawing manga as a career. After Mystery Man gives her Pigu and Mogu, they in turn give her a magical pen and sketchbook, which allow her to transform into a 15-year-old girl who she names Fancy Lala. Fancy Lala is scouted by Yumi Haneishi of Lyrical Productions, and gradually follows the path to stardom though her parents nor sister knows about this.
 
 Voiced by: Michiko Neya (Japanese), Chris Simms (English)
 A small pink dinosaur who accompanies Miho Shinohara. Mog is a girl.
 
 
 A small blue dinosaur who accompanies Miho Shinohara. Pog is a boy.
 
 
 A mysterious person who gave Miho Shinohara Pigu and Mogu. He often advises Miho/Fancy Lala; his name is never mentioned in the series.
 
 
 A popular idol who happens to be very attractive, Hiroya is Miho Shinohara's love-interest, and Fancy Lala's mentor at Lyrical Productions.
 
 
 The president of Lyrical Productions, who represent Fancy Lala.  She was once married to Kishi, the guitarist of Hiroya Aikawa's band but the two ended up getting divorced, and has a son named Tappei, who attends kindergarten.
 
  (Japanese)
 An employee at Lyrical Productions, and Fancy Lala's manager.
 
 
 Miho's classmate and next door neighbor, they often fight (often like an old married couple), but he cares about her deeply.  He is also the cousin of Miki Yumeno. He seems to have a romantic interest in Miho, however he doesn't know that Miho has a crush on Hiroya.
 
 
 A popular idol, Miki is Fancy Lala's main rival.  She is also the cousin of Taro Yoshida, Miho's male classmate from school.

Supporting cast
 
 
 Miho Shinohara's teacher.
 
 
 An employee at Lyrical Productions.
 
 
 Komiyama is Fancy Lala's stylist. It is hinted in the last episode that he knows more about what is going on than meets the eye.
 
  (Japanese)
 A classmate of Miho Shinohara.
 
 
 Miho Shinohara's older sister. She's also a freshman in high school and her uniform consists of a white sailor collared shirt with a green collar, a red ribbon and a grey pleated skirt.
 
 
 Miho Shinohara's mother, she works as a TV producer, and is often away from home.
 
 
 Miho Shinohara's father, he works as a paleontologist, and mostly works at home.
 
 
 An employee at Lyrical Productions.
 
 
 Miho Shinohara's classmate, and closest friend, she dreams of becoming an actress.

Production
Fancy Lala is a complete remake of an earlier Studio Pierrot OVA titled Harbor Light Story Fashion Lala Yori.  It was also influenced by Mahō no Tenshi Creamy Mami, the story of a ten-year-old Japanese girl granted the power to transform who also became an idol.

Harbor Light Story Fashion Lala Yori 
The original OVA was very different than the final series, being a retelling of Cinderella. In it, the heroine, Miho, a little girl who dreams of being a fashion designer, lives with her aunt and three cousins while her father is away on business. The aunt, who runs a dress shop, exploits Miho's dependence and makes her perform deliveries on her bike, while spoiling her own daughters. Of the three, the two oldest are cruel and mock Miho's dreams, but the youngest is nice to her. A local disco is holding a contest to find the next "Disco Queen." Miho is too young to enter, but decides to design a dress for her cousin. When the aunt finds out, she rips up the dress. After everyone leaves, two fairies take pity on Miho and transform her into "Fashion Lala," a sixteen-year-old blonde, so she can enter the contest herself. While performing, Miho's outfit changes into her previous designs, and it seems that she wins. At the end, she returns to a happy life with her father and her two oldest cousins apologized to Miho for being cruel to her and mocking her dreams for no reason. 

The heroine being named Miho and the two fairies, as well as the concept of an "evil cousin", were the only things retained for the final series.

Episode list

Internationalization
Fancy Lala was licensed by Bandai Entertainment for English release in 2001, and dubbed at Blue Water Studios. The series has been released on DVD, but is only distributed in region 1 outside Japan.

References

External links
 Magical Girl series site at Studio Pierrot 
 
 

1988 anime OVAs
1998 anime television series debuts
1998 manga
Bandai Entertainment anime titles
Bandai Visual
Magical girl anime and manga
Music in anime and manga
Pierrot (company)
Shōjo manga
Shueisha manga
Japanese idols in anime and manga